Godbluff is the fifth album released by  English progressive rock band Van der Graaf Generator. It was the first album after the band reformed in 1975 and was recorded after a European tour.

As the first self-produced album by the band, it featured a tighter, more pared-down sound than the band's earlier recordings with producer John Anthony. Hammill said "we did not want to make 'Son of Pawn Hearts''' with a big long side two and lots of studio experiments". Van der Graaf Generator would never work with an outside producer from this point forward. Hammill made extensive use of the Hohner Clavinet D6 keyboard, which he had first started using on his previous solo album, Nadir's Big Chance (1975).

The first release of the record in the United States was on Mercury Records. The 2005 reissue added live performances by the band of two songs from Peter Hammill's album The Silent Corner and the Empty Stage (1974), recorded at a concert at L'Altro Mondo, Rimini, Italy.

 Artwork Godbluffs album cover was minimal, consisting of a band logo and "stamped" red album title on an otherwise black sleeve. The band logo that first appeared here was designed by John Pasche; it would also be used on the next two albums, Still Life (April 1976) and World Record (October 1976). Godbluffs sleeve design was later parodied on the cover of Fall Heads Roll by The Fall.

 Reception 

In Melody Maker, the reviewer said that "in a very real sense, [Godbluff] is the sound of the mid-seventies: uncomfortable, coherent, unremitting, courageous". Geoff Barton of Sounds deemed Godbluff "simply, an essential buy". A negative review appeared in the Lancashire Evening Post in November 1975, in which Bob Papworth wrote that "Godbluff is a lengthy exhibition of the type of studiously avant-garde rock which so many other groups play infinitely better." Papworth added that "Guy Evans couldn't drum his way out of a paper bag and David Jackson's saxes and flutes are a little too simplistic to be credible."

In his 2011 AllMusic review, Steve McDonald wrote: "the album opened with daring quietness, with David Jackson's flute echoing across the stereo space, joined by Hammill's voice as he whispered the opening lines. There was sturm und drang to come, but the music had been opened up and the lyrics had developed more focus, often abandoning metaphor in favor of statement. Godbluff was a bravura comeback – only four cuts, but all were classics."

In a May 2002 review in Mojo magazine, Julian Cope said of the album: "It was the best re-formation ever. Godbluff'' was every inch a classic. It conjured up vast tracts of heathland, the burning huts of herdsmen, hordes of chariot maniacs trashing farmsteads, heads on javelins stuck in. And Hammill standing amidst all this, Zoroaster-like and mystified, searching desperately and eloquently for some semblance of moral where there was none."

Track listing 
All tracks written by Peter Hammill, except where indicated.

Bonus tracks on CD reissue 
 "Forsaken Gardens" – 7:58
 "A Louse Is Not a Home" – 12:47
 Both recorded live at L'altro Mondo, Rimini, Italy on 9 August 1975

Personnel 
Van der Graaf Generator
 Peter Hammill – vocals, piano, clavinet, electric guitar
 David Jackson – saxophones and flute
 Hugh Banton – Hammond organ (including bass pedals), bass guitar
 Guy Evans – drums and percussion
Technical
 Produced by Van der Graaf Generator
 Engineered by Pat Moran
 Cut by George Peckham at The Master Room

References

External links 
 Godbluff (1975) at vandergraafgenerator.co.uk
 Van der Graaf Generator Godbluff (1975) - review by Steven McDonald at AllMusic.com
 Van der Graaf Generator Godbluff (1975) - at Discogs.com
 Van der Graaf Generator Godbluff (1975) - at ProgArchives.com
 Van der Graaf Generator Godbluff (1975) - stream at Spotify.com
 

Van der Graaf Generator albums
1975 albums
Charisma Records albums
Mercury Records albums
Albums recorded at Rockfield Studios